María José Martínez Sánchez and Marina Melnikova were the defending champions, but Martínez Sánchez chose not to participate. Melnikova partnered Paula Kania, but they lost in the quarterfinals to Elitsa Kostova and Cornelia Lister.

Anna Blinkova and Lidziya Marozava won the title, defeating Sabina Sharipova and Ekaterina Yashina in the final, 4–6, 6–3, [11–9].

Seeds

Draw

References 
 Draw

Ankara Cup - Doubles
Ankara Cup